Ignacio Ariel Serricchio (born April 19, 1982) is an Argentine actor.  He is known for his role as Diego Alcazar on General Hospital and as Alejandro "Alex" Chavez on The Young and the Restless. Other roles include Lifetime's Witches of East End, seasons 9-12 of Bones, and the Netflix reboot of Lost in Space.

Life and career
Serricchio was born in Lanús, Argentina, and is a graduate of Syracuse University's drama department. In October 2004, Serricchio joined the cast of the ABC daytime soap General Hospital as troubled youth Diego Alcazar. He left the soap in November 2006. He returned as Diego on February 22, 2008, until his character was killed off on March 5, 2008. In 2005, Serricchio portrayed a streetwise Mormon missionary in the critically acclaimed film States of Grace. In 2007, he appeared in 6 episodes of Ghost Whisperer, where he played the character Gabriel Lawrence. In 2008, he portrayed Luis in the CW's Privileged. The show stopped filming on February 24, 2009, and was cancelled on May 19, 2009. From December 2012 to January 2014, he played the recurring role of police detective Alex Chavez on the CBS daytime soap The Young and the Restless. In 2014, he played the recurring role of medic Tommy Cole during the second and final season of the Lifetime drama series Witches of East End. In the summer of 2015, Serrichio was cast in the role of Miguel on the BET sitcom, Zoe Ever After starring Brandy Norwood. He played Dr. Rodolfo Fuentes on Bones, seasons 9-12. Starting in 2018, he appeared as Don West in Lost in Space, the Netflix remake of the 1965 TV series.

Personal life
Ignacio has described himself as “Italian” and “Hispanic”. He also speaks fluent Italian.

Selected filmography

References

External links
 

1982 births
Living people
Syracuse University alumni
Argentine emigrants to the United States
American male soap opera actors
American people of Italian descent
Argentine people of Italian descent
21st-century American male actors
21st-century Argentine male actors
Hispanic and Latino American male actors